Janice Francis-Irwin she is a British karateka. She is the winner of multiple European Karate Championships and World Karate Championships Karate medals.

References

External links
 
 

Living people
English female karateka
English exercise instructors
Black British sportswomen
English sportspeople of Grenadian descent
Isshin-ryū practitioners
Sportspeople from London
Year of birth missing (living people)
World Games bronze medalists
Competitors at the 1993 World Games
World Games medalists in karate
20th-century British women